Zabrus laevicollis is a species of ground beetle in the Aulacozabrus subgenus that is endemic to Algeria.

References

Beetles described in 1864
Beetles of North Africa
Endemic fauna of Algeria
Zabrus
Taxa named by Hermann Rudolph Schaum